is a subway station on the Toei Asakusa Line, operated by the Tokyo Metropolitan Bureau of Transportation. It is located in Minato, Tokyo, Japan. Its number is A-06.

The station serves the Shirokanedai neighborhood. Nearby are Meiji Gakuin University; several hotels including the Grand Prince Takanawa and the New Grand Prince Takanawa, the Le Méridien Pacific Tokyo and the Takanawa Tobu; and housing for the House of Representatives.

Station layout
Takanawadai Station has one platform serving two tracks.

History
Takanawadai Station opened on 15 November 1968, as a station on Toei Line 1. In 1978, the line took its present name.

References

Railway stations in Japan opened in 1968
Railway stations in Tokyo
Toei Asakusa Line
Buildings and structures in Minato, Tokyo